Hopewell was an unincorporated community in Cannon County, Tennessee, United States. It lay at an elevation of 784 feet (239 m). The Hopewell Baptist Church, which has held services since 1833, remains standing in the area now known as Bradyville.

References

Geography of Cannon County, Tennessee
Ghost towns in Tennessee